A suicide bombing incident occurred on December 14, 2010, by two suicide bombers, who blew themselves up in a crowded Shia Muslim mourning procession in the southeastern Iranian coastal city of Chabahar, outside Imam Husain Mosque. It took place on the day of Tasu'a, when Shiite Muslims gathered to commemorate the martyrdom of Husayn ibn Ali, the grandson of Muhammad through his daughter Fatimah and his successor Ali ibn Abi Talib. It killed 39 people.

Bombings 

The first bomber detonated his explosives outside the Imam Husain Mosque and another one carried out the attacks in the crowd of Shiite worshippers just a day before the Day of Ashura.  As per the Governor of Chahbahar, Ali Bateni. The first attacker was killed, however another one was arrested. The arrested suspect was caught after failing to set off his explosives outside the office of Chabahar's governor, according to LA Times.

Casualties 

Between 38 and 39 worshippers were killed in the blast, and more than 100 were injured. According to BBC, it is feared that many women and children were among the worshippers that were killed. The number of people who died had reached 41, according to The Guardian.

Suspects 

Al Arabiya reported Jundullah, a Sunni extremist rebel group, claimed responsibility for the bombing. Chahbahar's Governor Ali Bateni said the mastermind behind the attacks was arrested. According to France 24, Alaeddin Borujerdi, the parliament's foreign committee head, claimed that the U.S and Britain were sponsors of the attack.

See also
2018 Chabahar suicide bombing
June 2017 Tehran terror attacks
Terrorism in Iran
Shi'a-Sunni relations

References 

Attacks in Iran in 2010
Suicide bombings in 2010
Terrorist incidents in Iran in 2010
Terrorist incidents in Iran
History of Sistan and Baluchestan Province
2010 murders in Iran
Suicide bombings in Iran
Mass murder in 2010
Shia–Sunni relations
Jundallah (Iran)
Explosions in Iran
Violence against Shia Muslims in Iran